Azatrephes is a genus of moths in the family Erebidae erected by George Hampson in 1905.

Species
Azatrephes discalis Walker, 1856
Azatrephes fuliginosa (Rothschild, 1910)
Azatrephes orientalis Rothschild, 1922
Azatrephes paradisea (Butler, 1877)

References

External links

Phaegopterina
Moth genera